Thomas Cautley Newby (1797/1798 – 1882) was an English publisher and printer based in London.

Newby published Wuthering Heights by Emily Brontë and both Anne Brontë's novels, Agnes Grey and The Tenant of Wildfell Hall. He also published Anthony Trollope's first novel, The Macdermots of Ballycloran (1847).

References

External links

1790s births
1882 deaths
Publishers (people) from London
19th-century English businesspeople